The Emory Center for Alternative Investments is a part of the Goizueta Business School at Emory University. The Center seeks to provide independent research to the Alternative Investments Industry through papers, conferences, and education.  The Center primarily focuses on the needs of Institutional Investors as they navigate the many options available in the Alternative Investment Industry but also partners with asset managers to conduct research in an effort to remain objective.  The Center for Alternative Investments focuses on hedge funds, Private Equity, Venture Capital, and Real Estate.

History
In 2007, Emory University's Goizueta Business School received a $10 million gift to establish the Emory Center for Alternative Investments. In the Spring of the following year, Klaas Baks was appointed executive director of the center.

The primary objective of the Center for Alternative Investments is to provide research into the most important challenges faced by Institutional investors who invest in Alternative Investments. It studies a variety of problems ranging from best practice to public policy and industry perception.

In addition, the center was conceived as a meeting place for people interested and active in alternative investments. The center also aims to engage students and practitioners alike through classes, executive education, seminars, and networking events.

Research and Academic Contributions

Course Offerings 
 Venture Capital and Private Equity
 Distress Investing
 Doing Deals: Private Equity
 Illiquid frontiers in Alternative investments
 Applied investment management
 Investment Banking
 Corporate governance and restructuring
 Securities analysis and portfolio management
 Advanced managerial finance
 Fixed income securities
 Derivative asset analysis

Publications 
 On the Valuation of Venture Capital and Private Equity Securities
 Becker, Bo, and Joshua Pollet. "The decision to go private." Unpublished working paper (2008).
 Constraint on the Control Benefits of Brokerage: Evidence from U.S. Venture Capital Fundraising
 Embedding inter-organizational relations in organizational members' prior education and employment networks
 Risk and Expected Returns on Private Equity Investments: Evidence Based on Market Prices

White Papers 
 Interest alignment in the Private Equity Industry
 A research agenda for alternative investments: a Limited Partner's perspective

Student Involvement

Alternative Investments Group 
The Center sponsors a student group on campus, the Alternative Investments Group, which facilitates student involvement with the center through sponsoring case competitions and by bringing industry speakers to campus.  The group consists of juniors and seniors at the Goizueta Business School who want to expand their understanding of alternative investments and hope to pursue a career in alternative investments.

Case Competitions 
Each year the Alternative Investments Group hosts a number of case competitions open to graduate and undergraduate students.  The competitions include a Hedge Fund Competition wherein competitors devise an investment strategy and execute it over a three-month trading period, a Venture Capital Competition that allows students to simulate making an investment with an entrepreneur, and a Private Equity competition where competitors construct a buyout of a public company and pitch their investment recommendation.  All of the competitions are judged by professionals actively working in the respective industries, giving the participants the unique opportunity to receive feedback and advice from experts at hedge funds, venture capital shops, and private equity funds.

Alternative Investments Network 
The center's extended alumni network, The Alternative Investments Network, serves Emory alumni, students, and their colleagues who work or are interested in alternative investments, including private equity, hedge funds, venture capital, and real estate. The organization connects and expands the Emory community in these fields, and offers an ongoing series of events and opportunities in support of this effort. The network has established a presence in both the New York and Atlanta areas, and allows members to become integrally involved with Center and expand their professional networks.

Faculty

Leadership 
 Klaas Baks (executive director)
 Lawrence M. Benveniste (Faculty Advisor)
 Roy Black (Director of Real Estate Program)
 T. Clifton Green (Faculty Advisor)

Affiliated Faculty 
 Mark Bell
 Kevin Crowley
 Kathryn Furman
 John Grayken
 Roman Kraussl
 David Panton

References

External links
 Emory University
 Goizueta Business School
 Official Site

Business schools in Georgia (U.S. state)
Educational institutions established in 2008
Emory University
2008 establishments in Georgia (U.S. state)